Yaroslav Vyshnyak (born 22 July 1982) is a retired Ukrainian footballer who currently is a coach at Ukrainian Premier League club Kolos Kovalivka.

External links 
 
 
 
 

1982 births
Living people
Footballers from Kyiv
Ukrainian footballers
FC Zirka Kropyvnytskyi players
FC Zirka-2 Kirovohrad players
FC Ros Bila Tserkva players
FC Enerhiya Yuzhnoukrainsk players
FC Metalurh Zaporizhzhia players
FC Zorya Luhansk players
MFC Mykolaiv players
FC Obolon-Brovar Kyiv players
FC Hoverla Uzhhorod players
FC Nyva Ternopil players
FC Volyn Lutsk players
FC Putrivka players
FC Kolos Kovalivka players
Ukrainian Premier League players
Ukrainian First League players
Ukrainian Second League players
Association football defenders
FC Kolos Kovalivka managers
Ukrainian football managers
Ukrainian Premier League managers